Lithium molybdenum purple bronze is a chemical compound with formula , that is, a mixed oxide of molybdenum and lithium. It can be obtained as flat crystals with a purple-red color and metallic sheen (hence the "purple bronze" name).

This compound is one of several molybdenum bronzes with general formula  where A is an alkali metal or thallium Tl. It stands out among them (and also among the sub-class of "purple" molybdenum bronzes) for its peculiar electrical properties, including a marked anisotropy that makes it a "quasi-1D" conductor, and a metal-to-insulator transition as it is cooled below 30 K.

Preparation
The compound was first obtained by Martha Greenblatt and others by a temperature gradient flux technique. Excess reagents are dissolved with a hot potassium carbonate solution releasing metallic-purple plate-like crystals, a couple mm wide and less than a mm thick.

Structure 

The crystal system is monoclinic, with approximate unit cell dimensions a = 1.2762 nm, b = 0.5523 nm, and c = 0.9499 nm, with angle β = 90.61°, volume V = 0.6695 nm3 and Z = 2. In typical crystals, a is the shortest dimension (perpendicular to the plates) and b the longest. The density is 4.24 g/cm3. The structure is rather different from that of potassium molybdenum purple bronze , except that both are organized in layers.

The unit cell contains six crystallographically independent molybdenum sites. One-third of the molybdenum atoms are surrounded by four oxygens, two thirds are surrounded by six oxygens. The crystal is a stack of slabs; each slab consists of three layers of distorted  octahedra sharing corners.  The lithium ions are inserted in the large vacant sites between the slabs. There are zigzag chains of alternating molybdenum and oxygen atoms extending along the b axis.

Properties
Lithium molybdenum purple bronze is quite different than the sodium, potassium and thallium analogs. It has a three-dimensional crystal structure, but a pseudo-one-dimensional (1D) metallic character, eventually becoming a superconductor at about 2 K Its properties are most spectacular below 5 meV.  The Tomonaga-Luttinger liquid theory has been invoked to explain its anomalous behavior.

Electrical conductivity
At room temperature, Greenblatt and others (in 1984) measured the resistivity of lithium purple bronze along the a, b and c axes as 2.47 Ω cm, 0.0095 Ω cm, and on the order of 0.25 Ω cm, respectively. The conductivities would be in the ratio 1:250:10, which would make this compound an almost one-dimensional conductor.  However, Da Luz and others (2007) measured 0.079, 0.018, and 0.050 Ω cm, respectively, which corresponds to conductivity ratios 1:6:2.4 for a:b:c; whereas H. Chen and others (2010) measured 0.854, 0.016, and 0.0645 Ω cm, respectively, which correspond to conductivity ratios of 1:53:13.

This anisotropy has been attributed to the crystal structure, specifically to the zig-zag chains of molybdenum and oxygen atoms

Resistivity and temperature 

The resistivity along all three axes increases linearly with temperature from about 30 K to 300 K, as in a metal. This is anomalous since such a law is expected above the Debye temperature (= 400 K for this compound)  The resistivity ratios along the three axes are preserved in that range.

Metal-insulator transition 
As the lithium purple bronze is cooled from 30 K to 20, it changes abruptly to an insulator. After reaching a minimum at about 24 K, the resistivity increases 10-fold and becomes somewhat more isotropic, with conductivities 1:25:14.  The anisotropy is partially restored if a magnetic field is applied perpendicular to the b axis. The transition may be related to the onset of a charge density wave.  Santos and others have observed that the thermal expansion coefficient is largest along the a axis, so cooling will bring the conducting chains closer together, leading to a dimensional cross-over.  The theory of Luttinger liquids then predicts such behavior.  Anyway, as of 2010 there was no consensus explanation for this transition.

Superconducting state 
Lithium molybdenum purple bronze becomes superconductor between 1 and 2 K.

Thermal conductivity

Li0.9Mo6O17, due to spin–charge separation, can have a much higher thermal conductivity than predicted by the Wiedemann-Franz law.

Magnetoresistance 
The magnetoresistance of lithium purple bronze is negative when the magnetic field is applied along the b-axis, but large and positive when the field is applied along the a-axis and the c-axis.

See also
 Sodium tungsten bronze , a golden to purple metallic-looking compound.

References

Molybdenum compounds
Lithium compounds
Oxides